Kanorris Davis (born January 21, 1990) is an American football safety and linebacker who is currently a free agent. He played college football for Troy University. Davis has played for the New England Patriots of the National Football League, with whom he signed as an undrafted free agent in 2013, and the Toronto Argonauts of the Canadian Football League.

Early years
He attended Perry High School in Georgia. He was a three-time first-team selection for each all-district, all-area, and all-region teams. He was selected  to the second-team all-state team in sophomore year in high school. He was named to both North and South Classic All-State Team. He was selected all-state team twice along with being named region defensive player of the year twice while in high school. He set the school record most tackles in a single season along with setting another school record for sacks in a single year with 9 total sacks. He finished high school football with a total of 398 tackles, 24 sacks and 8 forced fumbles. He also competed in track & field. He was the Class 3A state runner-up in the 100 meters (10.94), with a best of 10.84 seconds in 2008. He ran on a state qualifying 1600 relay team (3:23.28) in 2007.

College career
He played college football as a linebacker for Troy University. He was named as All-Sun Belt Honorable Mention in 2011.

Professional career

New England Patriots
On May 3, 2013, Davis signed with the New England Patriots as an undrafted free agent. On September 1, 2013, he was signed to the practice squad.
On September 30, he was released 
On October 2 Davis was re-signed to the Patriots practice squad  He played defensive back for the Patriots.

Toronto Argonauts
Davis was signed by the Toronto Argonauts on February 8, 2016 to play linebacker. Davis suffered a severe knee injury during team practice on May 31, 2016 and was ruled out indefinitely for the 2016 CFL season. He was released by the team on June 5, 2016.

References

External links
Troy bio
New England Patriots bio

1990 births
Living people
Troy Trojans football players
New England Patriots players
American football safeties
American football linebackers
Canadian football linebackers
African-American players of American football
African-American players of Canadian football
Players of American football from Georgia (U.S. state)
People from Perry, Georgia
Toronto Argonauts players
21st-century African-American sportspeople